Camila Bonazzola  (born 21 May 1996) is an Argentine handball player for Vi.Lo and the Argentine national team.

She was selected to represent Argentina at the 2017 World Women's Handball Championship.

References

1996 births
Living people
Argentine female handball players
South American Games silver medalists for Argentina
South American Games medalists in handball
Expatriate handball players
Argentine expatriate sportspeople in Spain
Competitors at the 2018 South American Games
Handball players at the 2019 Pan American Games
Pan American Games medalists in handball
Pan American Games silver medalists for Argentina
Medalists at the 2019 Pan American Games
20th-century Argentine women
21st-century Argentine women